Judge Bell may refer to:

Griffin Bell (1918–2009), judge of the United States Court of Appeals for the Fifth Circuit
J. Spencer Bell (1906–1967), judge of the United States Court of Appeals for the Fourth Circuit
Kenneth D. Bell (born 1958), judge of the United States District Court for the Western District of North Carolina
Robert C. Bell (1880–1964), judge of the United States District Court for the District of Minnesota
Robert Holmes Bell (born 1944), judge of the United States District Court for the Western District of Michigan
Sam H. Bell (1925–2010), judge of the United States District Court for the Northern District of Ohio

See also
Justice Bell (disambiguation)